Niya Denise Butts (born January 10, 1978) is an American women's college basketball coach, currently associate head coach at the University of Kentucky. She is the former head coach at the University of Arizona.  As a player, she was a part of two national championships at the University of Tennessee.

Butts, a 6'0" forward from Americus, Georgia, played college basketball for Hall of Fame coach Pat Summitt at Tennessee from 1996 to 2000.  She was a reserve for the Lady Vols, averaging 2.3 points and 1.2 rebounds per game, but was a part of National Championship teams in both 1997 and 1998.  She was also a three-time Southeastern Conference All-Academic selection.

Following the close of her playing career, Butts entered the coaching ranks by taking an assistant coach role at Tennessee Tech in 2000.  After two years there, she spent a season at Michigan State, then moved to the University of Kentucky as an assistant for head coach Mickie DeMoss.  She was promoted to associate head coach for the 2007–08 season.

In 2008, she was named the first African-American head women's basketball coach at Arizona. On March 4, 2016, she coached her last game for Arizona at the Pac-12 tournament.

On May 14, 2016, the University of Kentucky announced that Butts would be returning to the women's basketball program as an assistant coach under head coach Matthew Mitchell.

Head Coaching Record

References

External links
 Arizona athletic bio

1978 births
Living people
American women's basketball coaches
Arizona Wildcats women's basketball coaches
Basketball coaches from Georgia (U.S. state)
Basketball players from Georgia (U.S. state)
Kentucky Wildcats women's basketball coaches
Michigan State Spartans women's basketball coaches
People from Americus, Georgia
Tennessee Lady Volunteers basketball players
Tennessee Tech Golden Eagles women's basketball coaches
Forwards (basketball)